Gweebarra Bay (Irish: Gaoth Beara) is located on the west coast of County Donegal, in Ireland. The mouth of the River Gweebarra and Innishkeel Island are here.

The towns on the bay are Narin; Portnoo; and Cor

References in popular culture
The majority of Lucy Caldwell's 2006 novel Where They Were Missed is set around Gweebarra Bay.
Irish singer Maggie Boyle's song "Gweebarra Shore" (album "Gweebarra" 1998) tells of loss and of childhood memories of this place.
Poet Seamus Heaney refers to Gweebarra in his poem "The Singer's House" published in 1979 as part of his collection Field Work.

See also
 List of bays of the British Isles

Bays of County Donegal